Pirgeh Bar-e Simin (also Romanized as Pīrgeh Bar-e Sīmīn; also known as Pīrgeh-ye Bareh Sīmīn) is a village in Howmeh-ye Jonubi Rural District, in the Central District of Eslamabad-e Gharb County, Kermanshah Province, Iran. At the 2006 census, its population was 276, in 66 families.

References 

Populated places in Eslamabad-e Gharb County